Amputella is a subgenus of flies belonging to the family Lesser Dung flies.

Species
M. bistylus Marshall, 1985
M. curvistylus Marshall, 1985
M. digitata Marshall, 1985
M. erecta Marshall, 1985
M. priapismus Marshall, 1985
M. ternaria Marshall, 1985

References

Sphaeroceridae
Diptera of North America
Diptera of South America
Insect subgenera